Dongargarh railway station (DGG) is a busy railway station in Mumbai–Howrah rail zone in SECR. It is situated in Dongargarh town in Rajnandgaon district of Chhattisgarh state. It is a very important railway junction near Rajnandgaon railway station. It is midway between Jatkanhar railway station and Paniyajob railway station.
DGG is main station to reach Bambleshwari Temple.

Dongargarh station is 107 kilometers from Raipur Junction railway station, via Bhilai, Durg, and Rajnandgaon

It serves Dongargarh town and Bambleshwari Temple. Dongargarh station is the stop point for all the pilgrims and devotees for visiting Maa Bambleshwari Temple Dongargarh station is 107 kilometers from Raipur railway station, via Bhilai, Durg, and Rajnandgaon. Dongargarh station is the main station connecting as Howrah–Nagpur–Mumbai line managed by SECR of NAGPUR DIVISION, MAHARASHTRA

References

Rajnandgaon
Railway stations in Rajnandgaon district